Coddington is a civil parish in Cheshire West and Chester, England. It contains seven buildings that are recorded in the National Heritage List for England as designated listed buildings, all of which are at Grade II. This grade is the lowest of the three gradings given to listed buildings and is applied to "buildings of national importance and special interest". The parish is entirely rural. The listed buildings consist of a church with a sundial in the churchyard, the village hall and an adjacent telephone kiosk, a farmhouse, the former rectory, and a former corn mill.

See also
Listed buildings in Aldford
Listed buildings in Aldersey
Listed buildings in Barton
Listed buildings in Churton by Aldford
Listed buildings in Churton by Farndon
Listed buildings in Clutton
Listed buildings in Farndon
Listed buildings in Handley
Listed buildings in Saighton

References
Citations

Sources

Listed buildings in Cheshire West and Chester
Lists of listed buildings in Cheshire